On the Brink may refer to:

On the Brink (board game), a 2009 expansion for Pandemic
"On the Brink" (Spooks), a television episode
On the Brink, a 1911 film directed by Edwin S. Porter
On the Brink, a 2003 film narrated by David Attenborough
On the Brink, a 2008 album by the Thirst
On the Brink: Inside the Race to Stop the Collapse of the Global Financial System, a 2011 memoir by Henry Paulson

See also

 On the Brink of Destruction (album), a 2010 album by 'Tonic Breed'
 Brinksmanship or brinkmanship
 
 
 Brink of Disaster (disambiguation)
 Brink (disambiguation)